Lovework, is the critically acclaimed debut Hiphop album by Gabriel Teodros, released February 27, 2007 on MassLine Media.

Overview
Aesthetically and politically, Lovework descends from a mid-'90s school of conscious Northwest hip hop, characterized by groups such as Black Anger and Silent Lambs Project. It was a time where the Seattle sound became jazzier—more melodic, intricate, and atmospheric. It turned away from the gangsta themes and beats that dominated the period and instead focused on progressive politics, utopian aspirations, and an organic connection with black Africa.

Lovework was produced by Amos Miller with additional beat contributions from Sabzi (of Blue Scholars), Moka Only, Kitone, and Specs One – its sound was primarily influenced by Seattle veteran Vitamin D (who also mixed the record) and the late J Dilla.

On Lovework, Gabriel Teodros ponders issues of racism, sexism, and colonialism, as well as lighter topics like romance and the art of rhyme.

The opening song Sacred Texts creatively namedrops groups of influence in Teodros' life, including A Tribe Called Quest, Freestyle Fellowship, Common, Boogie Down Productions, Public Enemy, Roy Ayers and Bob Marley.

In the song East Africa, Teodros first speaks about his family and how he grew up, and then goes on to talk about the 2005 Ethiopian police massacres.

The album title, Lovework was inspired by bell hooks and her book All About Love, where Hooks insists that to truly know love, one must agree that love is a verb. She goes further to say to truly know love, one must work to undo every system of domination that stops people from truly loving. The title was also inspired by a quote from Khalil Gibran's The Prophet where Gibran says "Work is love made visible".

There were 3 official music videos made for the Lovework album. The first 2 were both directed by Zia Mohajerjasbi; No Label (Esma Remix) and Don't Cry For Us featuring Khingz & Toni Hill. The third video was for Third World Wide and was directed by Salvatore Fullmore.

The album held the #1 spot on the CMJ Hip Hop charts for 2 weeks and came in at #19 for the year 2007.

Track listing
Sacred Texts (Intro)
Do U (feat. Jerm)
No Label (Esma Remix)
Beautiful (GT Version)
Sexcapism
Racoon Rock (feat. Toni Hill)
East Africa
Don't Cry For Us (feat. Khingz, Toni Hill)
In This Together
The Dirty 6 (skit)
It's That (feat. Geologic of Blue Scholars)
Third World Wide
Warriors (Lovework Reprise)
Chili Sauce
Find A Place (feat. Rajnii Eddins)
Lovework (feat. Toni Hill)
Rest O' Me Dayz (feat. Khingz)

References

2007 albums
Gabriel Teodros albums